This list is of the Cultural Properties of Japan designated in the category of  for the Metropolis of Tōkyō.

National Cultural Properties
As of 1 February 2016, six hundred and fourteen Important Cultural Properties have been designated (including sixty-three *National Treasures), being of national significance.

Prefectural Cultural Properties
As of 10 February 2016, twenty-four properties have been designated at a metropolitan level.

See also
 Cultural Properties of Japan
 List of National Treasures of Japan (paintings)
 Japanese painting

References

External links
  Cultural Properties in Tōkyō Metropolis

Cultural Properties,Tokyo
Cultural Properties,Paintings
Paintings,Tokyo
Lists of paintings